The following is a comparison of notable hex editors.

General

Features

See also
Comparison of HTML editors
Comparison of integrated development environments
Comparison of text editors
Comparison of word processors

Notes
ao: ANSI is the Windows character set, OEM is the DOS character set. Both are based on ASCII.

References

External links 
"Harry's Windows Hex Editor Review" (July 2002). harrymnielsen.tripod.com. Retrieved October 15, 2019.

Hex editors
 
Text editor comparisons